The Greater Richmond Region is a region and metropolitan area in the U.S. state of Virginia, centered on Richmond, the state capital. The U.S. Office of Management and Budget (OMB) defines the area as the Richmond, VA Metropolitan Statistical Area, a Metropolitan Statistical Area (MSA) used by the U.S. Census Bureau and other entities. The OMB defines the area as comprising 17 county-level jurisdictions, including the independent cities of Richmond, Petersburg, Hopewell, and Colonial Heights. As of 2016, it had a population of 1,263,617, making it the 45th largest MSA in the country.

The Greater Richmond Region is home to several major universities throughout the Commonwealth of Virginia. This is a list of colleges and universities in the city of Richmond and Greater Richmond Region.

Public universities

Private universities

Two-year institutions

Universities with satellite campuses 
Several in-state universities have satellite campuses or offices in the Greater Richmond Region given the Commonwealth's status as the capital.

See also 
 List of colleges and universities in Virginia

References 

R
 
Colleges
Education in Virginia